= Shaanxi Youser Group =

Chinese mining company

Shaanxi Youser (Chinese: 陕西有色金属控股集团有限责任公司; pinyin: Shǎnxī yǒusèjīnshǔ kònggǔ jítuán yǒuxiàn zérèn gōngsī) or Shaanxi Non-ferrous Metals Holding Group is the biggest molybdenum and titanium mining and metallurgy company in Shaanxi, China. Via subsidiaries, the company develops, manages, and operates non-ferrous metal resources, including lead, zinc, molybdenum, aluminum and titanium products, among others.

== Corporate affairs ==
Shaanxi Non-ferrous Metals Holding Group Co., Ltd. (Youser Group) was established in 2000 by the Shaanxi provincial government to consolidate key regional mining and metallurgy operations. Its core assets include controlling stakes in two major enterprises: Jinduicheng Molybdenum Co., Ltd., one of Asia's largest producers of molybdenum, and Baoti Group, a leading manufacturer of titanium and titanium alloy materials.

Although Jinduicheng Molybdenum is a publicly listed company on the Shanghai Stock Exchange (ticker: 601958), Youser Group holds a controlling interest of approximately 72% as of 2024, making it a key subsidiary of the group.

== History ==
Shaanxi Youser Group was established in 2000 through the reorganization of state-owned assets in the non-ferrous metals sector by the Shaanxi provincial government.

In 2012, Youser partnered with the Shaanxi provincial government to form a joint venture aimed at financing the resettlement of residents displaced by industrial development. The total project cost was US$950 million, with Youser initially contributing two-thirds of the funding. The company later provided an additional US$475 million through debt financing.

== Operations ==
- Baoti Group (China): The company owns and operates titanium extraction and processing facilities through Baoti Group (also known as Baoji Titanium Industry Co., Ltd.), one of China's most advanced producers of titanium sponge, ingots, and alloy materials for aerospace and industrial applications.
- Hui Dong Lead and Zinc Project (China): A large-scale project located in Sichuan Province, with an estimated annual production capacity of 450,000 tons. Shaanxi Youser has been competing with Western Mining Co., Ltd. for an 80% investment stake in this resource.
